Haikou Yazhou Gu Cheng is an unused group of buildings located just north of Haixiu Road, Haikou, Hainan, China. It was once a temple dedicated to a famous general. In 1993 it was expanded. In 1997, due to its dilapidated condition, the tourist department revoked its status as a visitor attraction. On February 27, 2005 there was a massive fire. It remains dilapidated with parts of it now used for such businesses as auto repair.

There is a similarly named place in Sanya in the south of the province that is unrelated.

References

External links
 

Buildings and structures in Haikou